Robert John Bolder (born 2 October 1958) is an English former footballer who played as a goalkeeper.

He started his career with local team Dover F.C. before moving to Sheffield Wednesday at the age of just 19. He played over 200 games whilst at Hillsborough. In 1983, he started a two-year stint as back-up for Bruce Grobbelaar at Liverpool. He won the European Cup in 1984, being placed on the substitutes bench in the final.	

He left Liverpool in 1985 for a brief spell with Sunderland before joining Charlton Athletic a year later. He established himself as first choice 'keeper for the Addicks for seven years. He was forced to retire from professional football in 1993 and had spells in non-league football with Dagenham & Redbridge and Margate. He has since returned to Charlton as part of their work in the community scheme. He regularly plays in goal for the Liverpool Masters team.

Honours
Liverpool
Football League First Division (1): 1983–84
League Cup (1): 1983–84
European Cup (1): 1983–84

References

External links
 
 Profile at LFCHistory.net

1958 births
Living people
Sportspeople from Dover, Kent
Footballers from Kent
English footballers
Association football goalkeepers
Sheffield Wednesday F.C. players
Liverpool F.C. players
Sunderland A.F.C. players
Charlton Athletic F.C. players
Dagenham & Redbridge F.C. players
Margate F.C. players
English Football League players
Dover F.C. players